Florence Sancroft (30 December 1902 – 22 January 1978) was a British swimmer. She competed in the women's 300 metre freestyle event at the 1920 Summer Olympics.

References

External links
 

1902 births
1978 deaths
British female swimmers
Olympic swimmers of Great Britain
Swimmers at the 1920 Summer Olympics
Sportspeople from London
British female freestyle swimmers
20th-century British women